Raymond Eustace Grant Govan, CBE (known more often as R.E. Grant Govan and also as REG Govan; December 1891, in Croydon district – 26 January 1940, in Hardwar, United Provinces) was a British industrialist based in Delhi and the first President of the Board of Control for Cricket in India.

Career 
He was the Managing Director of Govan Bros. Ltd., a leading business house of the time. The company was managing agents for a number of industrial enterprises. Grant Govan was a keen pilot and the founder of Indian National Airways Ltd, an aviation company formed in 1933 under Govan Bros Ltd. Apart from the airline, Govan Bros operated Delhi Flour Mills, set up Sugar Mills-Raza Buland at Rampur, Uttar Pradesh, and had a travel department, Govan Agencies (the Govan Bros Ltd businesses were sold in 1947 to the Ramkrishna Dalmia led Dalmia Group). Apart from the airline, Govan had other interests in aviation, like the Delhi Flying Club which he founded in 1928.

Govan was an avid sports enthusiast. He founded the Roshanara Cricket Club in Delhi, named after the nearby tomb of Roshanara Begum, with a group of friends in 1922. The club was officially inaugurated by Marquess of Reading in December 1922. Govan had the distinction of being both the founding President of the Board of Control for Cricket in India (BCCI) in 1928, a position he held till 1933 and the Cricket Club of India (CCI) in 1933. He, along with then BCCI secretary Anthony De Mello, was instrumental in getting the BCCI affiliated to the Imperial Cricket Conference (now International Cricket Council) in 1928.

In 1931 BCCI with Govan at its helm invited the Marylebone Cricket Club to tour India for the first time, with the support of Lord Irwin, the then Viceroy of India. When he died in 1940, Dr. P. Subbaroyan, then President of the (BCCI), issued a statement which read "In the death of Mr. Grant Govan, Indian Cricket has lost a friend ...". After his death, a few of his friends set up the Grant Govan Memorial Homes in Delhi. These are meant to be retirement homes for Anglo-Indians with limited means and were inaugurated by Marchioness of Linlithgow, wife of the then Viceroy of India in October 1940.

References

1891 births
1940 deaths
People from Croydon
British people in colonial India
English cricket administrators
Indian cricket administrators
Aviation history of India
Businesspeople from Delhi
Presidents of the Board of Control for Cricket in India